Lostwithiel is a civil parish and small town in Cornwall, England, United Kingdom at the head of the estuary of the River Fowey.  According to the 2001 census it had a population of 2,739, increasing to 2,899 at the 2011 census. The Lostwithiel electoral ward had a population of 4,639 at the 2011 census.  The name Lostwithiel comes from the Cornish "lostwydhyel" which means "tail of a wooded area".

Origin of the name
The origin of the name Lostwithiel is a subject much debated. In the 16th century it was thought that the name came from the Roman name Uzella, translated as Les Uchel in Cornish. In the 17th century popular opinion was that the name came from a translation of Lost (a tail) and Withiel (a lion), the lion in question being the lord who lived in the castle.

Current thinking is that the name comes from the Old Cornish Lost Gwydhyel meaning "tail-end of the woodland". The view from Restormel Castle looking towards the town shows how this may have come to be.

History
Lostwithiel was founded in the early 12th century by Norman lords who built the nearby Restormel Castle. Lostwithiel received its town charter in 1189. In the late 13th century, Edmund, 2nd Earl of Cornwall oversaw the building of the Great Hall, the bridge and the square church tower.

The Battle of Lostwithiel, an important battle in the First English Civil War, took place near Lostwithiel in 1644. In it Parliamentarian forces defeated by the Royalists. The Parliamentarians would go on to win the war but Cornwall remained under Royalist control until 1646.

The Lostwithiel constituency elected two members to the Unreformed House of Commons, but was disenfranchised by the Reform Act 1832. It remained a municipal borough until the 1960s, when it became a civil parish. The seal of the borough of Lostwithiel was a shield charged with a castle rising from water between two thistles, in the water two fish, with the legend "Sigillum burgi de Lostwithyel et Penknight in Cornubia". Its mayoral regalia includes a silver oar, signifying its former jurisdiction over the River Fowey.

Jaques Bagratuni, a prince and ambassador of Armenia to Britain, died in Lostwithiel on 23 December 1943 but was buried at Brompton Cemetery in London.

Geography
The town is situated in the Fowey river valley, positioned between the A390 road from Tavistock to Truro and the upper tidal reaches of the river.

Lostwithiel railway station is on the Cornish Main Line from Plymouth to Penzance. It is situated on the south side of the town, just across the medieval bridge. The line was originally built for the Cornwall Railway which built its main workshops here, but the surviving workshop buildings were transformed into apartments in 2004.  A branch line takes china clay trains to Fowey.

The town contains the suburbs of Bridgend to the east and Rosehill and Victoria to the west of the River Fowey.

To the south of the town is the Shirehall Moor nature reserve which follows the course of the River Fowey and opens out to a wide salt marsh. The reserve is a haven for birdlife including swans, ducks, egrets, herons, kingfishers and Canada geese.

Buildings
Lostwithiel's most notable buildings are St Bartholomew's Church and Restormel Castle. There is a small museum devoted to the history of the town. Once a stannary town, and for a period the most important in Cornwall, it is now much reduced in importance. There is a fine early fourteenth-century bridge with six pointed arches, and nearby the remains of the Lostwithiel Stannary Palace, with its Coinage Hall – this was the centre of royal authority over tin-mining, and 'coinage' meant the knocking off of the corner of each block of tin for the benefit of the Duchy of Cornwall. The small Guildhall has an arcaded ground floor.  The old Grammar School has been converted into dwellings.

Culture
The town has a playing field known as King George V Playing Field. Lostwithiel has several large parks including Coulson Park which was named after Nathaniel Coulson (the San Francisco property magnate) who was raised in Lostwithiel after being abandoned by his father.

The town is host to a number of annual cultural activities including an arts and crafts festival, a beer festival, a week-long carnival in the summer, food and cider festivals in October, and a Dickensian evening in December.

Education
There are two primary schools in Lostwithiel: St Winnow C E School and Lostwithiel Primary School. Both schools are academies. Lostwithiel Primary School is part of the Peninsula Learning Trust Multi Academy Trust and St Winnow C E School is part of The Saints Way Multi Academy Trust. The majority of children aged between 11 and 16 attend Fowey River Academy or Bodmin College.

Lostwithiel Educational Trust is a local charity which makes "grants to local schools and churches, as well as to individuals, for educational purposes"

Transport
From Lostwithiel railway station trains operated by Great Western Railway run approximately every two hours towards Plymouth or Penzance. Some through services to and from London Paddington station and those operated by CrossCountry between Penzance and Scotland also stop.

National Express provides a regular coach service to London which runs via Plymouth for connections to other destinations. The coach stop is located outside the Royal Talbot Hotel.

Bus stops in Lostwithiel are outside the Royal Talbot Hotel and Cott Road phone box.

Twinning
Lostwithiel was twinned with Pleyber-Christ in Brittany, France in 1979. The people in the Twinning Associations of both towns usually meet up every year, alternating between Lostwithiel and Pleyber Christ.

See also

Battle of Lostwithiel
List of topics related to Cornwall

References

External links

 Lostwithiel Town Council
  The History of Parliament Trust, Lostwithiel, Borough, from 1386 to 1868
 Lostwithiel.org.uk run by Lostwithiel Business Group
 
 GENUKI page
 Lostwithiel Bridge and its Memories – The Reverend Canon E Boger, 1887
 Lostwithiel OCS
 Cornwall Record Office Online Catalogue for Lostwithiel

 
Towns in Cornwall
Cornish capitals
Civil parishes in Cornwall
History of Cornwall